Jarrow ( or ) is a town in South Tyneside in the county of Tyne and Wear, England. The 2011 census area classed Hebburn and The Boldons as part of the town, it had a population of 43,431.

In the eighth century, the monastery of Saint Paul in Jarrow (now Monkwearmouth–Jarrow Abbey) was the home of The Venerable Bede, who is regarded as the greatest Anglo-Saxon scholar and the father of English history. The town is part of the historic County Palatine of Durham. From the middle of the 19th century until 1935, Jarrow was a centre for shipbuilding, and was the starting point of the Jarrow March against unemployment in 1936.

History and toponymy

Foundation
The town's name is recorded around AD 750 as Gyruum, representing Old English [æt] Gyrwum="[at] the marsh dwellers", from gyr="mud", "marsh". Later spellings are Jaruum in 1158, and Jarwe in 1228. In the Northumbrian dialect it is known as Jarra.

The Gyrwe is a reconstructed Saxon farm at Bede's World at Jarrow.

Monkwearmouth–Jarrow Abbey

The Monastery of Paul of Tarsus in Jarrow, part of the twin foundation Monkwearmouth–Jarrow Abbey, was once the home of the Bede, whose most notable works include Ecclesiastical History of the English People and the translation of the Gospel of John into Old English. Along with the abbey at Wearmouth, Jarrow became a centre of learning and had the largest library north of the Alps, primarily due to the widespread travels of Benedict Biscop, its founder. In 794 Jarrow became the second target in England of the Vikings, who had plundered Lindisfarne in 793. The monastery was later dissolved by Henry VIII. The ruins of the monastery are now associated with and partly built into the present-day church of St. Paul, which stands on the site. One wall of the church contains the oldest stained glass window in the world, dating from about AD 600. Just beside the monastery is Jarrow Hall, a working museum dedicated to the life and times of Bede. This incorporates Jarrow Hall, a grade II listed building and significant local landmark.

The world's oldest complete Bible, written in Latin to be presented to the then Pope (Gregory II), was produced at this monastery – the Codex Amiatinus. It is currently safeguarded in the Laurentian Library, Florence, Italy.

Originally three copies of the Bible were commissioned by Ceolfrid in 692. This date has been established as the double monastery of Wearmouth-Jarrow secured a grant of additional land to raise the 2000 head of cattle needed to produce the vellum for the Bible's pages. Saint Ceolfrid accompanied one copy (originally intended for Gregory I) on its journey to be presented to Gregory II, but he died en route to Rome. The book later appears in the ninth century in the Abbey of the Saviour, Monte Amiata in Tuscany (hence the description "Amiatinus"), where it remained until 1786 when it passed to the Laurentian Library in Florence.

19th century to present

Jarrow remained a small mid-Tyne town until the introduction of heavy industries such as coal mining and shipbuilding. Charles Mark Palmer established a shipyard – Palmer's Shipbuilding and Iron Company – in 1852 and became the first armour-plate manufacturer in the world. John Bowes, the first iron screw collier, revived the Tyne coal trade, and Palmer's was also responsible for the first modern cargo ship, as well as a number of notable warships. Around 1,000 ships were built at the yard, they also produced small fishing boats to catch eel within the River Tyne, a delicacy at the time. Jarrow Town Hall was erected in Grange Road and officially opened in 1904.

Palmer's employed as much as 80% of the town's working population until its closure in 1933 following purchase by National Shipbuilders Securities Ltd. (NSS). This organisation had been set up by Stanley Baldwin's Conservative government in the 1920s, but the first public statement had been made in 1930 whilst the Labour Party was in office. The aim of NSS was to reduce capacity within the British shipyards. In fact Palmer's yard was relatively efficient and modern, but had serious financial problems. As from 1935, Olympic, the sister ship of RMS Titanic, was partially demolished at Jarrow, being towed in 1937 to Inverkeithing, Scotland for final scrapping.

The Great Depression brought so much hardship to Jarrow that the town was described by Life as "cursed." The closure of the shipyard was responsible for one of the events for which Jarrow is best known. Jarrow is marked in history as the starting point in 1936 of the Jarrow March to London to protest against unemployment in Britain. Jarrow Member of Parliament (MP) Ellen Wilkinson wrote about these events in her book The Town That Was Murdered (1939). Some doubt has been cast by historians as to how effective events such as the Jarrow March actually were but there is some evidence that they stimulated interest in regenerating 'distressed areas'. 1938 saw the establishment of a ship breaking yard and engineering works in the town, followed by the creation of a steelworks in 1939.

The Jarrow rail disaster was a train collision that occurred on the 17 December 1915 at the Bede junction on a North Eastern Railway line. The collision was caused by a signalman's error and seventeen people died in the collision.

The Second World War revived the town's fortunes as the Royal Navy was in need of ships to be built. After 1945 the shipbuilding industries were nationalised. The last shipyard in the town closed in 1980.

Jarrow, in the year 1912, was the setting for the first of Monty Python's 'Spanish Inquisition' sketches, one of the best-known and quoted sketches by the comedy troupe.

In August 2014 a group of mothers from Darlington organised a march from Jarrow to London to oppose the privatisation of the NHS. The march took place in September 2014 and 3,000–5,000 people participated in the event.

Education
Jarrow's needs for secondary education are currently served by Jarrow School, formerly Springfield Comprehensive. Springfield was merged with another of Jarrow's secondary schools, Hedworthfield Comprehensive at Fellgate, following a gradual reduction of the number of new pupils for the yearly intake of 11-year-olds to the point where keeping both schools open was no longer viable. As of 2008 plans to revamp Jarrow School have come into action. Building work was completed in 2009 turning the school into a modern learning facility with Specialist Engineering Status. The head teacher at the school plans to improve the school's grade point average, by improving the learning facilities, costing millions of pounds.

Demography
In 2011, Jarrow had a population of 43,431, compared to 27,526 in 2001. This gives Jarrow a similar population to Wallsend and Whitley Bay. The large increase in population is mainly due to boundary changes.

The fact that only 2.9% of Jarrow's population is non White British, makes Jarrow the least ethnically diverse major urban subdivision in Tyneside and less ethnically diverse than its surrounding borough, South Tyneside. Jarrow contains areas such as Fellgate and Hedworth, which border onto Greenbelt in the south of the town, which have very high White British populations. In South Tyneside, 5.0% of the population are non-White British, which is almost double the figure for Jarrow, also the borough has twice the percentage of Asian people compared to this riverside town.

Compared to the rest of the North East of England Jarrow does have an increased rate of unemployment, average unemployment figures in 2013 put the north east at 5.4% as opposed to Jarrow at 6.1%. In September 2016 1,680 people living in Jarrow were in receipt of Job Seekers Allowance or Universal Credit, 370 people aged between 18 and 24 were on receipt of benefits in September 2016 down by 30 from last year, a drop of 7.5%.

Transport

Road
Jarrow is reached from the south by the A1(M) via the A194, and is connected to North Tyneside and Northumberland via the Tyne Tunnel.

Metro
Jarrow is served by three stations on the Tyne and Wear Metro: Jarrow station in the centre of the town (on the Yellow line) Bede station in the Bede industrial estate (also on the Yellow line), and Fellgate station (on the Green line) to the south.

Air
The nearest major airport is Newcastle Airport, between 15 and 18 miles away by road, or around 45 minutes by Metro.

Notable people
Notable former residents of the town, including Ellen Wilkinson MP, Charles Mark Palmer and William Jobling, have been remembered in the names of beers produced in the Town.

Roger Avon, actor
Bede, Benedictine monk and scholar
Catherine Cookson, writer
Steve Cram, Olympic athlete (the "Jarrow Arrow")
Ray Drinkwater, goalkeeper with Queens Park Rangers
Christie Elliot, professional footballer with Dundee.
Peter Flannery, playwright
William Goat, winner of the Victoria Cross for attempting to retrieve the body of a major whilst under attack by hostile cavalry, returning later under heavy fire to complete the task.
Stephen Hepburn, politician
James Johnston, socialist activist
Ray Lugg, professional footballer, born in Jarrow in 1948
Jem Mace, famous pugilist died at 6 Princess Street, Jarrow in 1910
Aidan McCaffery, former Newcastle United footballer.
John Miles, rock musician, singer, songwriter
Fergus Montgomery, Conservative MP
Charles Mark Palmer, shipbuilder, first mayor of Jarrow
Alan Plater, writer
Alan Price, musician, born in Washington and brought up in Jarrow
Steve Robson, songwriter and record producer
David Sharpe, silver medalist at 1992 European Championships over 800 metres
Gareth Smith, cricketer
Sir Patrick Stewart, actor, spent the majority of his childhood living in Jarrow, although was born in Mirfield, West Riding of Yorkshire.
Paul Thompson, rock musician, drummer of Roxy Music
Jimmy Thorpe, Sunderland goalkeeper who died helping the club win the 1936 League title
Frank Williams, Formula One team manager, was brought up in Jarrow
Ellen Wilkinson, Labour MP and Jarrow March organiser.
Wee Georgie Wood, music hall star.
Dan Neil, Sunderland midfielder.

Twin towns
Jarrow is twinned with the following towns, under the umbrella of the South Tyneside town-twinning project which saw individual twinning projects brought together in 1974:
 Wuppertal in Germany, originally twinned with South Shields in 1951.
 Noisy-le-Sec in France, originally twinned with Hebburn in April 1963.
 Épinay-sur-Seine in France, originally twinned with Jarrow in June 1965.

References

Notes

Sources
Gibbs, Philip. England speaks (1935)
Lloyd, T.O. Empire to Welfare State (1970)
Marwick, Arthur. Britain in our Century (1984)
Wilkinson, Ellen. The Town That Was Murdered: Depicting in Brief the History and Demise of Jarrow (1939)

External links

South Tyneside Council & Community website – Local council website
BBC History: The Jarrow Crusade

 
Towns in Tyne and Wear
Unparished areas in Tyne and Wear
Metropolitan Borough of South Tyneside